{{DISPLAYTITLE:Upsilon1 Eridani}}
an

Upsilon1 Eridani (υ1 Eri) is a single star in the constellation Eridanus. It has an apparent visual magnitude is 4.51, which is bright enough to be faintly visible to the naked eye on a clear, dark night. The distance to this star, as determined using the parallax method, is around 127 light years.

This is an evolved red clump giant star with a stellar classification of K0III-IV. At an estimated distance of this star, this yields a physical size of about 7.3 times the radius of the Sun. It has 154% of the Sun's mass and radiates 24 times the solar luminosity from its outer atmosphere at an effective temperature of 4,941 K.

References

K-type giants
Horizontal-branch stars
Eridanus (constellation)
Eridani, Upsilon1
Durchmusterung objects
Eridani, 50
029085
021248
01453